Tarabul's gerbil (Gerbillus tarabuli) is a species of small rodent which is found in arid regions of north western Africa.

Description
Tarabul's gerbil is a small mouse like rodent with a long tail which ends in a tuft. It has tawny fur on the dorsal surface and white fur on its ventral surface which is clearly demarcated. The ears are plain with no black tips a white spot just behind them and the soles of its feet bear hair. The sympatric occidental gerbil Gerbillus occiduus has ears with black tips and no spot behind them. The head and body length averages 102.9mm and the tail length averages 148.4mm.

Distribution
Tarabul's gerbil is found from northern Senegal, Mauritania, Western Sahara and Morocco east to Tibesti Mountains of Chad in the south and to Cyrenaica in eastern Libya in the north. The recently noted extension of its range into northern Senegal may be an indicator of increased desertification.

Habitat
Tarabul's gerbil occurs in sandy desert and semi-desert areas, as well as coastal steppe.

Habits
Tarabul's gerbil is a nocturnal species that digs complex, shallow burrows (15–25 cm in length) in the sand and which plugs the entrance to its burrow during the day. It breeds during throughout the rainy season, July to September, beginning breeding at the end of the coll dry season in April and ending at the start of the cool dry season in November. Barn owls Tyto alba have been recorded as preying on this species.

Taxonomy
Tarabul's gerbil was considered to be a junior taxonomic synonym of the greater Egyptian gerbil Gerbillis pyramidus but has a different chromosome count of 40 rather than 38 and differs morphologically.

References

Gerbillus
Rodents of Africa
Mammals described in 1902
Taxa named by Oldfield Thomas